Tim DeBoom (born November 4, 1970 in Cedar Rapids, Iowa), is a retired professional triathlete from Boulder, Colorado from 1995 to 2012. During that tenure, DeBoom participated in hundreds of triathlons around the world, winning both short course and long course triathlons. After a 10th place finish in the Hawaii Ironman in 1995, DeBoom focused on long distance racing, eventually winning the Ironman Triathlon World Championship in Hawaii twice (2001 & 2002).

Toward the end of his triathlon career, DeBoom won the infamous Norseman triathlon, becoming the first non-European man to achieve the feat. He completed the three part race in 11 hours, 18 minutes and 52 seconds.

Tim was inducted into the Hawaii Ironman Hall of Fame in 2019. 

DeBoom graduated from the University of Iowa with Bachelor of Science degrees in exercise physiology and anatomy.

Personal Life: Tim is married to Nicole (Molzahn) DeBoom (Dec 28, 1996) and has one daughter, Wilder DeBoom.

Accomplishments

Ironman Hawaii 

 1999: 3rd
 2000: 2nd
 2001: 1st
 2002: 1st
 2007: 4th

Other notable accomplishments 
 1993 Amateur National Champion
 1994 Amateur National Champion
 1994 Triathlon magazine Amateur Athlete of the Year
 1999 Pan Am Games: 3rd
 1999 Ironman New Zealand: 1st
 2001 Ironman California: 1st
 2002 Eagleman 1/2: 1st
 2003 California 1/2: 1st
 2003 Wildflower: 1st
 2005 Man A Mano: 1st
 2005 Soma 1/2: 1st
 2006 Ironman Arizona: 3rd
 2007 Ironman Arizona: 2nd
 2008 Longhorn 1/2: 5th
 2011 Norseman extreme triathlon: 1st

References

External links 
Triathlon Results for Tim DeBoom TRIResults.com

1970 births
Living people
Ironman world champions
American male triathletes
Triathletes at the 1995 Pan American Games
Triathletes at the 1999 Pan American Games
Pan American Games competitors for the United States